Lost Without Your Love is the sixth and final studio album by Bread, released in 1977.  The title track of this LP became the group's sixth and final top 10 hit, reaching number nine on the US Billboard Hot 100 in February 1977.  "Hooked on You", the follow-up single, subsequently reached number 60.

Track listing
"Hooked on You" – 2:18 (Gates)
"She's the Only One" – 3:00 (Griffin, Royer)
"Lost Without Your Love" – 2:56 (Gates)
"Change of Heart" – 3:18 (Gates, Griffin)
"Belonging" – 3:17 (Gates)
"Fly Away" – 3:05 (Griffin, Royer)
"Lay Your Money Down" – 2:41 (Gates)
"The Chosen One" – 4:40 (Gates)
"Today's the First Day" – 3:24 (Griffin, Royer)
"Hold Tight" – 3:05 (Gates)
"Our Lady of Sorrow" – 4:14 (Griffin, Royer)

Personnel
David Gates - vocals, guitar, bass, keyboards
James Griffin - vocals, guitar, keyboards
Larry Knechtel - keyboards, bass, guitar
Mike Botts - drums

Additional personnel
Dean Parks – guitar
Michael Boddicker – synthesizers
Tom Scott - saxophone, woodwinds

Certifications

References

1977 albums
Bread (band) albums
Elektra Records albums
Albums produced by David Gates